A. "Parsu" Parasuraman is a marketing professor and author. He is the Professor and the James W. McLamore Chair in Marketing at the University of Miami.

Education
Parasuraman got his bachelor's degree in Mechanical Engineering from IIT Madras and MBA in Marketing from Indian Institute of Management Ahmedabad in 1970 and 1972 respectively. He then proceeded to the United States where he gained a doctorate in Business Administration from Indiana University in 1975.

Career
Parasuraman was one of the co-authors of the classic study on Services marketing, which developed the concept of SERVQUAL. The SERVQUAL model has become fundamental in the analysis of marketing in the services sector and one of the highest cited marketing papers ever.

He has also been involved in developing the Technology Readiness Index (TRI), which measures the degree of technology readiness and adoption in businesses.

External links
 Faculty page

References

Living people
American business theorists
American marketing people
Marketing people
Marketing theorists
IIT Madras alumni
Indian Institute of Management Ahmedabad alumni
Indiana University alumni
University of Miami faculty
Fellows of the American Marketing Association
Year of birth missing (living people)